Sterneck is a surname. Notable people with the surname include:

 Esta Sterneck, German molecular biologist
 Maximilian Daublebsky von Sterneck (1829–1897), Austrian admiral 
 Moritz Daublebsky-Sterneck (1912–1986), Austrian Righteous Among the Nations
 Robert von Sterneck (1839–1910), Austro-Hungarian army officer, astronomer, and geodesist

See also 

 Cape Sterneck
 Sterneck Island